Abdul Quadir (1 June 1906 – 19 December 1984) was a Bangladeshi poet, essayist, and journalist. He was the recipient of Bangla Academy Literary Award in 1963 and Ekushey Padak in 1976.

Early life and education
Quadir was born in the village of Araisidha in Comilla District to Afsaruddin (d. 1973), a jute businessman. Quadir's mother died of cholera when he was 2 years old. He first studied at Bazar Chartola Madrasa, which was moved to Araisidha in 1932 and later named as Araisidha Kamil Madrasa. He passed the matriculation from Annada Model High School in Brahmanbaria in 1923. In 1925, he passed the ISc from Dhaka Intermediate College. He then enrolled at the University of Dhaka.

Career
Quadir published and edited the monthly Jayati during 1930–1933. He served in various posts at the Saptahik Nabashakti (1934), Jugantar (1938), Dainik Nabajug (1941), Banglar Katha, weekly Mohammadi (1946) and weekly Paigam (1947-52). He returned to Dhaka in 1952. From 1964 to 1970, he was publication officer of the Central Bengali Development Board.

Personal life
Quadir first married Dilruba Begum of Majhipara in Nabinagar Upazila. She died 3 months later in a palki accident. Later he married Nargis, a daughter of the communist activist Muzaffar Ahmed.

Works
 Dilruba (1933)
 Uttar Basanta (1967)
 Kavi Nazrul (1970)
 Kazi Abdul Wadud (1976)
 Yugakavi Nazrul (1986)
 Chhanda Samiksan (1979)
 Bangla Chhander Itibrtta (1985)

Awards
 Bangla Academy Literary Award (1963)
 Adamjee Literary Award (1967)
 Ekushey Padak (1976)
 Nazrul Academy Gold Medal (1977)
 Comilla Foundation Medal (1977)
 Mohammad Nasiruddin Gold Medal (1977)
 Muktadhara Prize

References

1906 births
1984 deaths
Bengali Muslims
Bengali-language writers
20th-century Bengali poets
20th-century Bengalis
Bengali-language poets
Bengali male poets
Bangladeshi essayists
Bangladeshi male poets
Bangladeshi journalists
20th-century essayists
20th-century male writers
20th-century Bangladeshi poets
Recipients of the Ekushey Padak
Recipients of Bangla Academy Award
Recipients of the Adamjee Literary Award
20th-century journalists
People from Ashuganj Upazila
People from Comilla District